Taliesin West was architect Frank Lloyd Wright's winter home and studio in the desert from 1937 until his death in 1959 at the age of 91. Today it is the headquarters of the Frank Lloyd Wright Foundation.

Open to the public for tours, Taliesin West is located on Frank Lloyd Wright Boulevard in Scottsdale, Arizona. The complex drew its name from Wright's home, Taliesin, in Spring Green, Wisconsin.

History 
Wright and the Taliesin Fellowship began to "migrate" to Arizona each winter in 1935 to escape the harsh Wisconsin winters for Wright's health on his doctor's advice. In 1937 Wright purchased the plot of desert land that would soon become Taliesin West. He paid "$3.50 an acre on a southern slope of the McDowell Range overlooking Paradise Valley outside Scottsdale."

Wright believed this to be the perfect spot for such a building: a place of residence, a place of business and a place to learn. Wright described it like this, "Finally I learned of a site twenty-six miles from Phoenix, across the desert of the vast Paradise Valley. On up to a great mesa in the mountains. On the mesa just below McDowell Peak we stopped, turned, and looked around. The top of the world."

An investment of over $10,000 was needed to dig a well deep enough to provide sufficient water for the campus. In the initial winters Wright and his students lived in tents while they built the first structures, mainly by hand using as much local material as possible (rocks, stone and sand). The design of the buildings complemented the natural Sonoran Desert landscape of the site.

When Wright and his family arrived they found Native American petroglyphs among the rocks. One of them, seen at the beginning of the guided tour, shows what may be hands clasping. Wright stylized the figures into interconnected lines, which became the symbol of Taliesin West.

Design 

Wright felt very strongly about the connection to the desert. He said: 

The structure's walls are made of local desert rocks, stacked within wood forms, filled with concrete - colloquially referred to as "desert masonry". Wright always favored using the materials readily available rather than those that must be transported to the site. In Wright's own words: "There were simple characteristic silhouettes to go by, tremendous drifts and heaps of sunburned desert rocks were nearby to be used. We got it all together with the landscape…" The flat surfaces of the rocks were placed outward facing and large boulders filled the interior space so concrete could be conserved.

Natural light also played a major part in the design. In the drafting room, Wright used translucent canvas to act as a roof (later replaced by plastic because of the intense wear from the Arizona sun). In the south-facing dining room, Wright did not take the masonry walls from floor to ceiling, and designed the roof to hang past the walls preventing unwanted sun rays from penetrating but allowing for horizontal light to pass through the room. Wright believed natural light aided the work environment he had his apprentices in, keeping the inside of his building in touch with the natural surroundings.

Every part of Taliesin West bears Frank Lloyd Wright's personal touch. Upon every return after a summer in Wisconsin Wright would grab a hammer and immediately make his way through the complex. He would walk through each room making changes or shouting orders to apprentices closely following with wheelbarrows and tools. He constantly changed and improved on his design fixing arising problems and addressing new situations. Throughout the years he enlarged the dining room, as well as added the cabaret theatre, music pavilion and numerous other rooms. All of the furniture and decorations were designed by Wright and the majority built by apprentices. A brilliant aspect of Wright's design is the cabaret theatre. Built with six sides, out of the standard rock-concrete mixture, in an irregularly hexagonal shape, the theatre provides its occupants with what someone has called "95% acoustic perfection". Someone sitting in the back row can hear the lightest whisper from a speaker on stage.

Power lines controversy 
The view at Taliesin West was critical to its success. In the 1940s, Wright waged a battle against overhead power lines on aesthetic grounds. In the late 1940s when power lines appeared within the view of Taliesin West, Wright wrote President Harry S. Truman, demanding they be buried; it was a losing battle. So after briefly considering rebuilding in Tucson, he "turned his back on the valley," moving the entrance to the rear of the main building.

Wright gravesite
After his death in Phoenix on April 9, 1959, Wright was buried, in accordance with his wishes, next to the Unity Chapel in the Lloyd-Jones cemetery, near Taliesin in Wisconsin. His third wife Olgivanna's dying wish was that Wright, she, and her daughter by her first marriage all be cremated and interred together in a memorial garden being built at Taliesin West. Although Olgivanna had taken no legal steps to move Wright's remains and against the wishes of other family members, as well as the Wisconsin legislature, in 1985, Wright's remains were removed from his grave by members of the Taliesin Fellowship, cremated, and sent to Scottsdale, where they were later interred in the memorial garden. The original grave site in Wisconsin, now empty, is still marked with Wright's name.

Legacy 

During his lifetime, Wright continually altered and added to the complex of buildings, all of which were constructed by students.

Many of Wright's most famous buildings were designed in the drafting room at Taliesin West, including the Guggenheim Museum in New York City and Grady Gammage Auditorium at Arizona State University in Tempe.

Taliesin West continues as the headquarters of The Frank Lloyd Wright Foundation and its several programs.  

The structure was added to the National Register of Historic Places on February 12, 1974, and was designated as a National Historic Landmark on May 20, 1982.

In 2008, the U.S. National Park Service submitted Taliesin West along with nine other Frank Lloyd Wright properties to a tentative list for World Heritage Status. The 10 sites have been submitted as one single site. The January 22, 2008, press release from the National Park Service website announcing the nominations states that, "The preparation of a Tentative List is a necessary first step in the process of nominating a site to the World Heritage List." After revised proposals, Taliesin West and seven other properties were inscribed on the World Heritage List under the title "The 20th-Century Architecture of Frank Lloyd Wright" in July 2019.

See also 

 List of Frank Lloyd Wright works

References 
Notes

Bibliography

External links 

 Taliesin West at the Frank Lloyd Wright Foundation
 SOAT – School of Architecture at Taliesin

Architecture museums in the United States
Architecture schools in the United States
Artists' studios in the United States
Biographical museums in Arizona
Buildings and structures in Scottsdale, Arizona
Frank Lloyd Wright buildings
Historic American Buildings Survey in Arizona
Historic house museums in Arizona
Houses completed in 1937
Houses in Maricopa County, Arizona
Houses on the National Register of Historic Places in Arizona
Modernist architecture in Arizona
Museums in Scottsdale, Arizona
National Historic Landmarks in Arizona
National Register of Historic Places in Maricopa County, Arizona
School buildings on the National Register of Historic Places in Arizona
Schools in Arizona
1937 establishments in Arizona